Horace Smith (5 July 1908 – 1975) was a footballer who played in the Football League for Coventry City and Nottingham Forest.

Career
Smith was born in Stourbridge and began his career with Holly Hall, Brierley Hill Alliance and Stourbridge before moving to Third Division South side Coventry City in 1930. He played five times for the Sky Blues in the 1930–31 before leaving for Welsh non-league side Merthyr Town. He spent four years with Merthyr Town and was signed by Stoke City in the 1935–36 season. He left at the end of the campaign without breaking into the first team and he joined Second Division side Nottingham Forest. After only one appearance for Forest, Smith left the club and went on to play for Shrewsbury Town and Revo Athletic.

Career statistics
Source:

References

English footballers
1908 births
1975 deaths
Association football midfielders
English Football League players
Stoke City F.C. players
Brierley Hill Alliance F.C. players
Stourbridge F.C. players
Coventry City F.C. players
Merthyr Town F.C. players
Nottingham Forest F.C. players
Shrewsbury Town F.C. players